Suriyan Satta Kalloori is a 2009 Tamil language action drama film directed by R. Pavan. The film stars newcomers Kajni and Mithra Kurian, with Radha Ravi, Pawan, M. S. Bhaskar, Ganja Karuppu, Aarthi, Kadhal Sukumar and Chaams playing supporting roles. The film, produced by Sivasakthi Pandian, had musical score by Deva and was released on 25 September 2009.

Plot

The film begins with Suriyan (Kajni) getting into a fight with another cellmate and then remembering about his past.

Suriyan was a model law college student and also the chairman of the student council. Everyone liked him in the college. He and the new student Mahalakshmi (Mithra Kurian) fell in love with each other. Suriyan initiated a proposal for instituting a national 'Best Student' award and travels to Delhi to submit his proposal to the central government. In the meantime, Vetrichelvan (Pawan), with the support of a politician, joins as a student in the same college. Upon his arrival, Thiruchelvan eve teased the college girls, humiliated the professors, and violated the college rules on purpose. Suriyan first tried a soft method to change Vetrichelvan, but it failed, so Suriyan had to use his fists to teach him a lesson. Vetrichelvan was admitted to the hospital in a serious condition, and his twin brother Kalaichelvan (Pawan), a local don, decided to take revenge on Suriyan.

Kalaichelvan posed as Vetrichelvan, entered the college, and acted as a good student. The twin brothers then started playing with Suriyan and confused everyone. They even created a conflict between Suriyan and Mahalakshmi. Suriyan then found out about their trick. During a fight, Suriyan killed the twin brothers in front of Mahalakshmi's eyes to save her as she was abducted. In court, Suriyan, who did not want to disrespect the law, confessed that he had killed them and was sentenced to the death penalty.

Back to the present, the government accepts Suriyan's 'Best Student' project and wants to award Suriyan of the first award. The film ends with Mahalakshmi, the college students, the college principal, and the professors mourning the death of Suriyan.

Cast

Kajni as Suriyan (Suriyanarayan)
Mithra Kurian as Mahalakshmi
Radha Ravi as College Principal
Pawan as Vetrichelvan and Kalaichelvan 
M. S. Bhaskar as Saama Iyer
Ganja Karuppu as Idithangi
Aarthi as Booma
Kadhal Sukumar as Raghu
Chaams as Kethu
Rajyalakshmi as Suriyan's mother
Besant Ravi as Ravi
Selvaraj
Sujibala in a special appearance
Srikanth Deva in a cameo appearance
Deva in a cameo appearance

Production
Sivasakthi Pandian, who had produced films like Kadhal Kottai (1996) and Vetri Kodi Kattu (2000), returned after a brief exile with Suriyan Satta Kalloori, a film directed by newcomer R. Pavan. Newcomer Kajni, son of the producer Kaja Mohideen, and Malayalam actress Mithra Kurian were signed to play the lead roles. Actors like Pawan, Radha Ravi, M. S. Bhaskar, Ganja Karuppu, and Aarthi were roped in for playing prominent roles. U. K. Senthil Kumar took care of camera works while Deva scored the music and the editing was handled by S. Surajkavee.

Soundtrack

The film score and the soundtrack were composed by Deva. He took 21 days to complete the re-recording. The soundtrack, released in 2009, features 5 tracks with lyrics written by Kabilan and R. Pavan.

Release
The film was released on 25 September 2009 alongside four other films.

Critical reception
S. R. Ashok Kumar of The Hindu said, "One does welcome the story, written by producer Sivasakthi Pandian, which has such a message. The director in his screenplay also has many loose ends that ultimately leave a lot of questions unanswered". Pavithra Srinivasan of Rediff.com rated the film 1 out of 5 and wrote, "Suriyan Satta Kalloori tries to address real problems and gives solutions but it's done in such a cheesy, clichéd fashion, with wooden acting and special effects that the message itself is hopelessly lost". Another reviewer said, "While its lead character is bland and uninteresting, its story takes a convoluted, illogical route to convey its message".

Box office
The film took a below average opening at the Chennai box office.

References

2009 films
2000s Tamil-language films
2009 action drama films
Indian action drama films
Films scored by Deva (composer)
Films set in universities and colleges
2009 directorial debut films